Nashwa Mustafa (born 15 October 1968), is an Egyptian actress. She is best known for the roles in the films; El-Rehla, El-Farah and in the television shows; The Family of Mr Shalash and Mahmoud the Egyptian .

Personal life
Nashwa Mustafa was born on 15 October 1968 in Cairo, Egypt.

She is married to Mohammed Emad, who lived in USA for a long period of time. However he returned Egypt to have a religious wedding according to their tradition. They married in 1993 and have two children, Maryam and Abdulrahman. Her son Abdulrahman married in July 2019.

Career
She started her television career in 1990 in the popular comedy serial The Family of Mr Shalash, she played the role 'Enas' in the serial. Her next role was in the serial Conscience of Teacher Hikmat. She played the role 'Abeer' in that serial. Then in 1999, she made her film debut with the film El-Farah. In 2001, she acted in the popular Egyptian adventure comedy film Africano, where she played the role 'Zainab'. The film was theatrically released and made its premier on 11 July 2001 in Egypt.

In 2013, she hosts the television program Cash Taxi, which was the Egyptian version of British international game show Cash Cab (British game show). The program telecast on MBC Masr.

In 2017, she made the television program Three in One. In 2018, she produced the stage play Selfie Ma’a el-Mot, which was first performed on Miami Theatre. Previously the play was named as Selfie Ma’a Sayedna, but later changed because of the Media Control Department obligations.

Filmography

References

External links
 
 Nashwa Mostafa: “My Mother and Not My Women” program made me a millionaire
 Nashwa Mustafa falls from the ladder of her home due to the Dragon storm
 Depressed Nashwa
 Tags of Nashwa in Saudi24 news

Living people
Egyptian film actresses
Egyptian television actresses
1968 births
Egyptian television presenters
Egyptian comedians